Eye to Eye is a Philippine television talk show broadcast by GMA Network. Hosted by Inday Badiday, it premiered on January 11, 1988. In 1991, the show was expanded into one hour and it was reformatted to include a public service portion. The show concluded on August 9, 1996.

Hosts
 Inday Badiday

Segment hosts
 Nap Gutierrez 
 Alfie Lorenzo

Substitute hosts
 Kris Aquino
 Janice de Belen
 Cristy Fermin
 Sharon Cuneta

Segments
 Eye Sore
 Eye Witness Showbiz Balita
 Eye Catcher
 Eye Opener
 Eye of the Week
 Pandora's Box (co-hosted by Alfie Lorenzo)
 Lahat Lahat Na
 Mata ng Bayan
 Mata ng Buhay (The PLDT Good News)
 Sports Eye
 Eye Phone
 Showbiz na Showbiz
 Mata sa Mata

Accolades

References

External links
 

1988 Philippine television series debuts
1996 Philippine television series endings
Filipino-language television shows
GMA Network original programming
GMA Integrated News and Public Affairs shows
Philippine television talk shows